Henry Edward Harris (6 August 1854 − 8 November 1923) was an English cricketer. Harris was a right-handed batsman who played for Hampshire.

Harris made his first-class debut for Hampshire in 1880, where he played three matches; two against Sussex and one against the Marylebone Cricket Club.

Harris died at Littlehampton, Sussex on 8 November 1923. His son, Edwin, also played first-class cricket.

External links
Henry Harris at Cricinfo
Henry Harris at CricketArchive

1854 births
1923 deaths
Sportspeople from Brighton
English cricketers
Hampshire cricketers